Evangelos Depastas (6 January 1932 – 5 January 2009) was a Greek athlete. He competed at the 1956 Summer Olympics and the 1960 Summer Olympics. He was named the 1957 Greek Athlete of the Year.

References

1932 births
2009 deaths
Athletes (track and field) at the 1956 Summer Olympics
Athletes (track and field) at the 1960 Summer Olympics
Greek male sprinters
Greek male middle-distance runners
Olympic athletes of Greece
Mediterranean Games bronze medalists for Greece
Mediterranean Games medalists in athletics
Athletes from Athens
Athletes (track and field) at the 1955 Mediterranean Games
20th-century Greek people